The 17th Canadian Parliament was in session from 8 September 1930, until 14 August 1935.  The membership was set by the 1930 federal election on 28 July 1930, and it changed only somewhat due to resignations and by-elections until it was dissolved prior to the 1935 election.

It was controlled by a Conservative Party majority under Prime Minister Richard Bedford Bennett and the 15th Canadian Ministry.  The Official Opposition was the Liberal Party, led by William Lyon Mackenzie King.

The Speaker was first George Black, and later James Langstaff Bowman.  See also List of Canadian electoral districts 1924-1933 for a list of the ridings in this parliament.

It was the third longest parliament in Canadian history.

There were six sessions of the 17th Parliament:

List of members

Following is a full list of members of the seventeenth Parliament listed first by province, then by electoral district.

Electoral districts denoted by an asterisk (*) indicates that district was represented by two members.

Alberta

British Columbia

Manitoba

New Brunswick

Nova Scotia

Ontario

Prince Edward Island

Quebec

Saskatchewan

Yukon

By-elections

References

Succession

Canadian parliaments
1930 establishments in Canada
1935 disestablishments in Canada
1930 in Canada
1931 in Canada
1932 in Canada
1933 in Canada
1934 in Canada
1935 in Canada